is a Japanese professional footballer who plays as a midfielder for Kamatamare Sanuki.

References

External links

1996 births
Living people
Japanese footballers
Association football midfielders
Kamatamare Sanuki players
J3 League players